Athar ul-Haque Malik (born 13 November 1952), known professionally as Art Malik, is a Pakistani-born British actor who achieved international fame in the 1980s through his starring and subsidiary roles in assorted British and Merchant Ivory television serials and films. He is especially remembered for his portrayal of the out-of-place Hari Kumar in The Jewel in the Crown at the outset of his career.

Early life
Malik was born Athar ul-Haque Malik in Bahawalpur, Pakistan, the son of Zaibunisa and Mazhar ul-Haque Malik, a doctor who worked as an ophthalmic surgeon in Britain. When his father got a job as a surgeon in Moorfields Eye Hospital, Malik was brought to London in 1956, aged three. From the age of eleven, he attended Bec Grammar School in Tooting.

After an unsatisfactory stint of business studies and a term studying acting at the Questors Theatre, he won a scholarship to Guildhall School of Music and Drama. Before long, he was working with the Old Vic and Royal Shakespeare companies.

Career
In 1982, five years after leaving Guildhall, Malik was cast as Hari Kumar in the Granada Television production of The Jewel in the Crown, based on Paul Scott's Raj Quartet.

In 1987, he played Kamran Shah, an Afghan Mujahideen leader who allies with James Bond and leads a raid against Soviet invaders in the 007 film The Living Daylights.

Malik played the role of the son of an Indian mobster in the 1992 film City of Joy and, in 1993, narrated Salman Rushdie's Haroun and the Sea of Stories on BBC television's Jackanory.

In 1994, Malik played his first big screen villain, Salim Abu Aziz, a stereotypical Islamist, opposite Arnold Schwarzenegger in True Lies. Malik accepted the role, which he described as "a hoot", at a time when he had been 14 months without work and was being pursued by the Inland Revenue for £32,000. Following his appearance in True Lies, Malik was offered several roles in other action films, but turned them down, later explaining, "I didn't want to do action movies that weren't as good." He instead accepted a role in the film Clockwork Mice. Malik took the lead role in the West End production of Tom Stoppard's 1995 play Indian Ink.

In 1999, Malik played the supporting role of Olympos, the court doctor to Cleopatra, Queen of Egypt, in Cleopatra.

In 2001, he narrated the television documentary Hajj: The Journey of a Lifetime for broadcast on BBC Two and in 2002 he narrated the three part television mini-series The British Empire in Colour for TWI/Carlton Television.

He also played Milkha Singh's father in the 2013 Hindi language film Bhaag Milkha Bhaag, his first appearance in a film produced in India.

Malik had a starring role in Tom Fontana's historical television series Borgia, which ran from 2011 to 2014.

In 2014, Malik played Bunran "Bunny" Latif, a retired Pakistani general in season four of Homeland, returning in the same role in season eight in 2020.

In 2017 he appeared in the first series of Bancroft. 

Malik appeared in the second episodes of both series 8 of the show Doc Martin in 2017 and series 11 of Doctor Who, "The Ghost Monument" in 2018.

Personal life
By Malik's own account, the sudden success he enjoyed in 1984 resulted in his excessive drinking. "I was surrounded by people who admired me and I took all of that home with me," he said when interviewed in 2003. "I paid lots of attention to my ego, and not enough to my spirit. It was totally unhealthy, like an illness." The result was a strain on his marriage, leading to his wife leaving him. He also ran up high bills on his credit card, and by 1993 he owed £55,000 to the bank and £32,000 to the Inland Revenue, and was on the verge of being declared bankrupt when he got the lucrative part of Salim Abu Aziz, a terrorist, in James Cameron's True Lies. He and his wife reunited.

Malik took a major role in fundraising for relief work for victims of the Gujarat earthquake in 2001, and also appeared on the DEC Pakistan Floods Appeal advertisement in 2010.

He lives with his wife Gina Rowe, a fellow student at the Guildhall, whom he married in 1980. They have two daughters, Jessica and Keira. Although from a Muslim background, and having insisted that his character on Holby City should be a Muslim, Malik describes himself as "not a practising Muslim. I'm probably an apostate, and liable for any right-minded Muslim fundamentalist to put me on a list of people to stamp out."

Filmography

Film

Television

References

External links
 
 
 

1952 births
Alumni of the Guildhall School of Music and Drama
British film actors of Pakistani descent
British male actors of South Asian descent
English male film actors
English male stage actors
English male television actors
English people of Pakistani descent
Living people
Male actors from London
Naturalised citizens of the United Kingdom
Pakistani emigrants to the United Kingdom
People from Bahawalpur
Punjabi people
Royal Shakespeare Company members